Two referendums were held in Liechtenstein during 1975. The first was held on 2 March on reducing the amount of money distributed to local councils (which had been approved by a 1970 referendum) and was rejected by 56.8% of voters. The second was held on 30 November on amending article 46 of the constitution (concerning elections and composition of the Landtag) and was rejected by 50.3% of voters, a margin of 22 votes.

Results

Reducing the amount of money distributed to local authorities

Amendment of Article 46 of the constitution

References

Liechtenstein referendums
Referendums
Referendums in Liechtenstein
Liechtenstein referendums